Slaven Španović (born 23 August 1988) is a Croatian actor.

Filmography

Television roles

Movie roles

External links

Notes

1988 births
Living people
People from Sremska Mitrovica
Croats of Vojvodina
21st-century Croatian male actors
Croatian male stage actors
Croatian male film actors
Croatian male television actors
Serbian emigrants to Croatia